Charles Blomfield may refer to

 Charles Blomfield (artist) (1848–1926), New Zealand artist
 Charles James Blomfield (1786–1857), British bishop 
 Charles James Blomfield (Indian Army officer) (1855–1928), British general

See also
 Blomfield